The Michigan Wing of Civil Air Patrol (CAP) is the highest echelon of Civil Air Patrol in the state of Michigan. Michigan Wing headquarters are located in Selfridge Air National Guard Base. The Michigan Wing consists of over 1,200 cadet and adult members at over 42 locations across the state of Michigan.

Mission
Civil Air Patrol performs three primary missions: providing emergency services in support of federal, state and local agencies; offering cadet programs for youth; and providing aerospace education for both CAP members and the general public.

Emergency services
Civil Air Patrol conducts search and rescue missions directed by the Air Force Rescue Coordination Center at Tyndall Air Force Base in Florida. Civil Air Patrol also assists in disaster relief efforts by providing air and ground digital imagery, key personnel transportation, and conducts a national radio communications network. Civil Air Patrol provides Air Force support, including light transport, communications support, and low-altitude route surveys, and assists in counter-drug missions. Michigan members are trained to NIMS compliance.

In May 2020, members of the Michigan Wing were a critical component in the fight against 2020 coronavirus pandemic. Members of the Michigan Wing began transporting coronavirus test kits between Lansing and more remote areas of Michigan as a part of Michigan's response to the 2020 coronavirus pandemic. Additionally, members of the Michigan Wing led the demobilization efforts of the Alternative Care Sites that were established at the TCF Center in Detroit and the Suburban Collection Showplace in Novi, as members of the Incident management team.

Cadet programs
Civil Air Patrol runs a cadet program for youth ages 12–21. Cadets receive orientation flights in small aircraft as part of their overall aerospace education, learn to lead, participate in a variety of national, state and local activities and improve their physical fitness.
Michigan cadets meet 2.5  hours per week and one weekend per month on average. They also have opportunities to attend leadership encampments, career academies, and other special activities during the spring and summer.

Aerospace education
Civil Air Patrol offers education for its own members and the general public. Education to the general public is offered by providing workshops for educators and youth throughout the nation through schools and public aviation events. Cadets may attend Flight Academies, Model Rocketry, RC Airplanes, and  Orientation Flights in both a Cessna and a glider.

Resources
As of 2012, the Michigan Wing has 10 Single-Engine planes and 2 glider. They have 16 Vehicles, mainly 9-10 seat vans split between the squadrons. They have 13 VHF/FM Repeaters and 175 VHF/FM stations, with 27 HF stations.

Organization

Legal protection
Under the Civil Air Patrol Employment Protection Act, employers in the state of Michigan are required by law to grant a leave of absence to their employees who are members of Civil Air Patrol, when those employees are deployed to an emergency mission. An employer may not discriminate against, discipline, or discharge an employee for being a member of Civil Air Patrol or for taking a leave of absence to assist in an emergency mission.

See also
Michigan Air National Guard
Michigan Naval Militia
Michigan Volunteer Defense Force

References

External links
Michigan Wing Civil Air Patrol official website

Wings of the Civil Air Patrol
Education in Michigan
Military in Michigan